The Hokkaido Marathon held in Sapporo, Hokkaidō, Japan, is one of the prominent marathon races of the year.

The staging area as well as both the start and finish lines are in Odori Park starting between Nishi 3-chome and Nishi 4-chome and the finishing at Nishi 8-chome. The course is sanctioned by both the Japan Association of Athletics Federations (JAAF) and AIMS, meaning it is eligible for world record performances.

History 

The Hokkaido Marathon was first held in 1987 with 439 entrants and 380 starters.

In 2009, the time limit was increased to 5 hours.

For the 2012 edition of the race, the start was moved from Nakajima Park to Odori Park.

In 2013, the number of finishers of the full marathon exceeded 10,000 for the first time.

The 2020 edition of the race was cancelled because the marathon usually took place in August, while the marathon event of the Tokyo 2020 Summer Olympics was scheduled to take place in Sapporo that August as well.  Logistical issues, such as a likely shortage of staff to organize the marathon due to the Paralympics taking place around the same time, and the short timeframe in which the areas used by the Olympic marathon would have to be reset for the Hokkaido Marathon, led to the decision to cancel the marathon.

Winners 
Key:

See also
 Sapporo Half Marathon

Notes

References

Winners
Larner, Brett (2010-02-05). Hokkaido Marathon. Association of Road Racing Statisticians. Retrieved on 2010-08-30.

External links 
 
 Marathon info
 2010 race review

Recurring sporting events established in 1987
Marathons in Japan
Sports competitions in Sapporo
Tourist attractions in Sapporo
August sporting events
Annual sporting events in Japan
1987 establishments in Japan